Gazoryctra lembertii is a moth of the family Hepialidae. It is known from the United States, including California.

The wingspan is about 32 mm.

References

Moths described in 1894
Hepialidae
Moths of North America